Hopewell Gardens is an unincorporated community in Hillsborough County, Florida, United States.

References

Unincorporated communities in Hillsborough County, Florida
Unincorporated communities in Florida